

See also 
 Virginia's 1st congressional district special election, 1810
 United States House of Representatives elections, 1810 and 1811
 List of United States representatives from Virginia

Notes

References 

1811
Virginia
United States House of Representatives